Yellow cab is a common name for taxicab companies.

Yellow cab may also refer to:

Brands and enterprises
 Yellow Cab Company, a taxicab company in Chicago
Yellow Cab Pizza Co., a pizza chain
Yellow cab, TUIfly's callsign, replaced in December 2013

Other uses
 Yellow cab (stereotype), an ethnic stereotype of Japanese women

See also 
 The Yellow Cab Man (1950), an American movie starring Red Skelton